North East is a borough in Erie County, Pennsylvania, United States,  northeast of Erie.  Located in the county's northeastern corner, the name comes from the geographical location. The population was 4,114 at the 2020 census, down from 4,294 in 2010. Fruit growing was an early economic endeavor, and is still to this day, as this is a popular area especially for cherries and grapes. There is an annual Cherry Festival in the summer and an annual Wine Country Harvest Festival in autumn.  It is part of the Erie Metropolitan Statistical Area. It is the northernmost town in Pennsylvania.

History
Before 1650, the area was settled by the Eriez, a relatively peaceful tribe; however, they were destroyed by the Seneca.

As part of the Erie Triangle, it was only in 1792 that the locale became part of Pennsylvania. However, North East did not receive its first settler until 1794, still, several years before the county (Erie) and township (North East) was organized. Originally the North East Township was called "Lower Greenfield" being downstream from Greenfield Township. The first road was built in 1797 from present-day Freeport at the mouth of Sixteenmile Creek to present day Colt Station now in Greenfield Township. That road was extended in 1798 to where French Creek forks (present-day Wattsburg).  In 1798 the first school was formed. In 1800 a road from the village of North East to Wattsburg was opened, it paralleled, but ran east of, the first one from Freeport. In 1801 the first church was organized, it was Presbyterian.

In 1884, a fire destroyed two-thirds of the town's business district.

In 1983, Short's Hotel was listed on the National Register of Historic Places. In 1990 the entire old central business district was added to the register.

Government
The Borough of North East is incorporated as a borough under Pennsylvania law. The Borough is governed by a mayor–council government. The government consists of a mayor, and a six-member borough council. They are elected to four-year terms, with the terms of the council designed to be overlapping. The Borough Council prepares legislation and conducts oversight. The council meets in North East Borough Hall. Jon Triana is the mayor of the Borough of North East and was first elected in 2021. , the North East Borough Council consists of:

 Denise McCumber
 Bill Beardsley
 Todd Luke
 Heather Jones
 Ryan D. McGregor
 Amber Belson

North East is in Pennsylvania's 16th congressional district and is currently represented in Congress by Republican Mike Kelly, who was elected in 2010. Republican Dan Laughlin of the 49th District represents North East in the Pennsylvania State Senate and Republican Jake Banta of the 4th District represents North East in the Pennsylvania House of Representatives.

Geography 
North East is located in northeastern Erie County at  (42.213385, -79.833711). It is surrounded by North East Township.

Demographics 

As of the census of 2000, there were 4,601 people, 1,730 households, and 1,162 families residing in the borough. The population density was 3,515.4 people per square mile (1,356.1/km2). There were 1,795 housing units at an average density of 1,371.5 per square mile (529.0/km2). The racial makeup of the borough was 97.65% White, 0.80% African American, 0.09% Native American, 0.09% Asian, 0.59% from other races, and 0.78% from two or more races. Hispanic or Latino of any race were 1.87% of the population.

There were 1,730 households, out of which 35.7% had children under the age of 18 living with them, 48.9% were married couples living together, 14.4% had a female householder with no husband present, and 32.8% were non-families. 29.3% of all households were made up of individuals, and 14.1% had someone living alone who was 65 years of age or older. The average household size was 2.53 and the average family size was 3.12.

In the borough, the population was spread out, with 27.5% under the age of 18, 11.2% from 18 to 24, 27.0% from 25 to 44, 20.3% from 45 to 64, and 13.9% who were 65 years of age or older. The median age was 34 years. For every 100 females, there were 94.5 males. For every 100 females age 18 and over, there were 87.9 males.

The median income for a household in the borough was $36,431, and the median income for a family was $43,250. Males had a median income of $33,939 versus $21,921 for females. The per capita income for the borough was $16,132. About 10.0% of families and 13.6% of the population were below the poverty line, including 18.3% of those under age 18 and 11.9% of those age 65 or over.

School District
The North East School District includes Earle C. Davis Primary School, Intermediate Elementary School, North East Middle School, and North East High School.

References

Further reading
 Gallagher, Marty. (1985) North East Past, North East, Pennsylvania: The North East Breeze Publishing Co. (Brown-Thompson Newspapers, Inc.)  (compilation of newspaper articles)
 Green, Walter R. (1981) North East, Pennsylvania 1850-1890, Erie, Pennsylvania: Mercyhurst College.
 Loop, Admah Irwin (1984) One hundred years of North East, North East, Pennsylvania: The North East Breeze Publishing Co. (Brown-Thompson Newspapers, Inc.)  (compilation of newspaper articles from 1934 to 1937)

External links 
 

Populated places established in 1800
Boroughs in Erie County, Pennsylvania